New Alluwe is a town in Nowata County, Oklahoma, United States. The population was 95 at the 2000 census.

Geography
New Alluwe is located at  (36.609452, -95.487754).  In the middle twentieth century, New Alluwe was established at a site relocated from the construction of Oologah Lake. The old townsite now lies at the bottom of that lake.

Demographics

As of the census of 2000, there were 95 people, 35 households, and 29 families residing in the town. There were 39 housing units at an average density of 335.2 per square mile (125.5/km2). The racial makeup of the town was 53.68% White, 27.37% Native American, and 18.95% from two or more races.

There were 35 households, out of which 37.1% had children under the age of 18 living with them, 71.4% were married couples living together, 8.6% had a female householder with no husband present, and 14.3% were non-families. 14.3% of all households were made up of individuals, and 2.9% had someone living alone who was 65 years of age or older. The average household size was 2.71 and the average family size was 2.93.

In the town, the population was spread out, with 26.3% under the age of 18, 5.3% from 18 to 24, 21.1% from 25 to 44, 29.5% from 45 to 64, and 17.9% who were 65 years of age or older. The median age was 40 years. For every 100 females, there were 93.9 males. For every 100 females age 18 and over, there were 89.2 males.

The median income for a household in the town was $28,750, and the median income for a family was $30,000. Males had a median income of $23,750 versus $18,438 for females. The per capita income for the town was $9,918. There were 6.7% of families and 8.5% of the population living below the poverty line, including 7.9% of under eighteens and none of those over 64.

History

Many of the first inhabitants came from the town of Alluwe after the U.S. Army Corps of Engineers constructed the Oologah Dam across the Verdigris River to form Oologah Lake in the 1950s.  Alluwe is now a ghost town.

References

Towns in Nowata County, Oklahoma
Towns in Oklahoma